Max Leo (1941 — July 20, 2012) was a West German luger who competed during the early 1960s. He won the silver medal in the men's doubles event at the 1962 FIL World Luge Championships in Krynica, Poland. He had been married to former alpine skier Burgl Färbinger.

References

German male lugers
1941 births
2012 deaths